Acanthocinus obliquus is a species of longhorn beetle of the subfamily Lamiinae. It was described by John Lawrence LeConte in 1862.

References

Beetles described in 1862
Acanthocinus